Abdel Nabi El-Sayed Mahran (born 29 January 1950) is an Egyptian boxer. He competed in the men's bantamweight event at the 1976 Summer Olympics. At the 1976 Summer Olympics he lost to Bernardo Onori of Italy.

References

1950 births
Living people
Egyptian male boxers
Olympic boxers of Egypt
Boxers at the 1976 Summer Olympics
Place of birth missing (living people)
Bantamweight boxers
20th-century Egyptian people